A hair tie (also called a ponytail holder, hair band, hair elastic, wrap around, gogo, or bobble) is an item used to fasten hair, particularly long hair, away from areas such as the face. This is usually done as part of a hairstyle such as pigtails, bunches, or ponytails for straight, wavy, and loosely curled hair, and referred to as afro puffs, bunny tails, and "pineapples" for highly curled and highly textured natural hair. Two common types of hair tie are the scrunchie and the elastic. The term can also include a fixed tie or rubber band which is placed through or around strands to hold specific parts of hair together, rather than tie it or clasp together like a hair clip. 

Hair ties' elasticity and durability vary according to the material or materials from which they are made.

History

Hair ties have likely been in use for thousands of years. In the 18th century wigs used a "queue" or "tail", consisting of a leather strap or small bag, to hold the wig together and support it.

The early to mid 19th century and the modernisation of the rubber industry allowed for use of rubber in clothing, which would ultimately include early elastic hair ties.

Other names for hair ties

Hair ties are known by numerous names. Among the more common are:

 Bands
 Binder
 Bobbin
 Bobble
 Bunchie
 Chongo
 Ding dong
 Dodoggle
 Doof
 Dooflatchee
 Elastic band
 Gogo
 Hair band
 Hair binder
 Hair bow
 Hair deals
 Hair elastic 
 Hair elastic band
 Hair holder
 Hair knick knacks
 Hair lacky
 Hair thing
 Hair Toggle
 Hair up
 Liga
 Nubby-doo
 Ponytail holder
 Ribbon
 Rubber band
 Scrunchie
 Twistie
 Whiztinger
 Woogie
 X-Twist

See also 
 Barrette
 Headband
 Rubber band
 Scrunchie

References 

Headgear
Hairdressing